Riley Cole Ferrell (born October 18, 1993) is an American professional baseball pitcher for the Sioux Falls Canaries of the American Association of Professional Baseball. He played college baseball at TCU.

Career
Ferrell attended in A&M Consolidated High School in College Station, Texas. After high school, he attended Texas Christian University (TCU) to play college baseball. As a freshman in 2013, he appeared in 23 games and had a 2.20 earned run average (ERA), 39 strikeouts and three saves. As a sophomore, Ferrell became TCU's closer and had a school record 15 saves. He also had a 0.79 ERA with 70 strikeouts. Returning as the closer again his junior season in 2015, Ferrell set TCU's career saves record. He finished the year with 14 saves, a 2.83 ERA and 45 strikeouts.

Houston Astros
Ferrell was drafted by the Houston Astros in the third round of the 2015 MLB draft. Ferrell was assigned to the Quad Cities River Bandits, where he pitched to a 1.08 ERA in 16.2 innings pitched.

In 2016, he spent with the Lancaster JetHawks, where he posted a 1.80 ERA in 10 innings pitched, but he underwent shoulder surgery in May, thus ending his 2016 season.

In 2017, he returned and pitched for both the Buies Creek Astros and Corpus Christi Hooks, posting a combined 2–2 record and 3.67 ERA in 38 games between both teams. Ferrell split the 2018 season between the Triple-A Fresno Grizzlies and Corpus Christi, accumulating a 4.53 ERA in 43 appearances between the two teams.

Miami Marlins
Ferrell was selected by the Miami Marlins with the 4th selection in the 2018 Rule 5 draft.

In 2019, he opened the season on the injured list with biceps tendinitis. On May 16, he began his rehab with the Jacksonville Jumbo Shrimp, appearing in two games before being promoted to the New Orleans Baby Cakes on May 21. On June 21, 2019, the Marlins placed Ferrell on outright waivers.

Houston Astros (Second Stint)
Ferrell was returned to the Houston Astros on June 24, 2019, before playing a single game in the majors. He finished the year pitching in 12 games between the Triple-A Round Rock Express and Corpus Christi. Ferrell did not play in a game in 2020 due to the cancellation of the minor league season because of the COVID-19 pandemic. In 2021, Ferrell spent the year with the Triple-A Sugar Land Skeeters, posting a 2.93 ERA with 48 strikeouts in 40.0 innings pitched across 38 games. He elected free agency following the season on November 7, 2021.

Sioux Falls Canaries
On March 12, 2022, Ferrell signed with the Sioux Falls Canaries of the American Association of Professional Baseball.

See also
Rule 5 draft results

References

External links

TCU Horned Frogs bio

1993 births
Living people
Baseball pitchers
Baseball players from Texas
Buies Creek Astros players
Corpus Christi Hooks players
Jacksonville Jumbo Shrimp players
Jupiter Hammerheads players
Lancaster JetHawks players
Mesa Solar Sox players
New Orleans Baby Cakes players
People from College Station, Texas
Quad Cities River Bandits players
Round Rock Express players
Sugar Land Skeeters players
TCU Horned Frogs baseball players
United States national baseball team players